Morten Brander Knudsen (born 28 April 1995) is a Danish footballer who plays as a central midfielder for German club Phönix Lübeck.

Career
Knudsen was signed by Italian club Inter Milan in January 2013, from Danish club Midtjylland, as a youth. He spent a year and a half in Inter's reserve team.

On 21 August 2014 Knudsen was farmed to affiliated club Prato in a temporary deal. The club signed several players from Inter as part of the partnership agreement. On 13 August 2015 the loan deal was renewed.

On 15 September 2017, Knudsen signed an amateur contract with Norwegian club Sarpsborg 08. The club couldn not offer him a professional contract because they had to many foreign players in the squad, so Knudsen was incorporated in the reserve squad.

On 23 January 2018, it was announced that Knudsen had signed with Vendsyssel FF. In June 2021, his contract with the club expired amidst uncertain circumstances at the club, where the foreign owners had left shortly after survival in the Danish 1st Division became a fact.

On 5 August 2021, Knudsen joined German club 1. FC Phönix Lübeck.

International career
Knudsen made his competitive debut for Denmark youth team on 12 October 2011, a 4–1 win against Italy U17. Denmark qualified from 2012 UEFA European Under-17 Championship qualifying round. However, Knudsen was dropped from the squad for the elite round. Knudsen was re-selected to 2014 UEFA European Under-19 Championship qualifying round. Knudsen was a substitute of Mikkel Wohlgemuth and Johannes Ritter, respectively.

References

External links
 

1995 births
Living people
Danish men's footballers
Danish expatriate men's footballers
Denmark youth international footballers
Association football midfielders
Serie C players
Hellerup IK players
FC Midtjylland players
Inter Milan players
A.C. Prato players
Vendsyssel FF players
1. FC Phönix Lübeck players
Danish Superliga players
Danish 1st Division players
Expatriate footballers in Italy
Expatriate footballers in Germany
Danish expatriate sportspeople in Italy
Danish expatriate sportspeople in Germany